At least two ships of the French Navy have borne the name Forfait:

 , a screw corvette launched in 1859 and sunk in a collision in 1875
 , a  launched in 1879 and stricken in 1897

French Navy ship names